Frogpool is a hamlet in the parish of Gwennap (where the 2011 census population was included), Cornwall, England. It has a local public house called the Cornish Arms  and up until a few years ago also had a local convenience store which has since closed.

References

Hamlets in Cornwall